La Pedrera is a town and municipality in the southern Colombian Department of Amazonas. The town in on the southern bank of the Caquetá River,  from the border with Brazil.

It is served by La Pedrera Airport.

Climate
La Pedrera has a tropical rainforest climate (Köppen Af) with heavy to very heavy rainfall year-round.

References

Gobernacion del Amazonas, La Pedrera

Municipalities of Amazonas Department